Rice Lake National Wildlife Refuge is located in Aitkin County in east central Minnesota, five miles south of the community of McGregor. It was established in 1935 for waterfowl habitat preservation. The refuge includes Rice Lake itself, a shallow, 3,600-acre wild rice-producing lake. The refuge has been designated as a Globally Important Bird Area by the American Bird Conservancy due to the importance of the lake and its wild rice as a food source to migrating waterfowl, especially ring-necked ducks.

It is managed by the U.S. Fish and Wildlife Service  for the conservation and, where appropriate, restoration of fish, wildlife and plant resources and their habitats for the benefit of present and future generations of Americans.

The refuge contains 14 miles of scenic roads and more than 7 miles of walking trails.

References
Refuge website

National Wildlife Refuges in Minnesota
Protected areas of Aitkin County, Minnesota
Protected areas of Pine County, Minnesota
Protected areas established in 1935
Wetlands of Minnesota
Landforms of Aitkin County, Minnesota
Landforms of Pine County, Minnesota